USS Condor (AMc-14) was a coastal minesweeper of the United States Navy. The ship was constructed as the wooden-hulled purse seiner New Example at Tacoma, Washington in 1937. Acquired by the U.S. Navy on 28 October 1940, converted into a coastal minesweeper and placed in service on 18 April 1941.

U.S. Navy career 
The Coast Guard manned Condor departed for Hawaii 14 May 1941 arriving on 28 May for service in  Hawaiian waters. Condor was in Pearl Harbor on the day the attack occurred and is believed to have made the first enemy contact at 0350 and at 0357 notified  by visual signals of a periscope sighting whereupon Ward began searching for the contact. At about 0637 Ward sighted a periscope apparently tailing  whereupon she attacked the target, thus  firing the first shots of the Pacific War. They later found out that they spotted the periscope of a Japanese midget submarine attempting to get into the harbor.  Condor spent the war in or near Hawaii with the U.S. Navy.

Condor was placed out of service at San Diego on 17 January 1946, struck from the List of District Craft in February 1946 and transferred to the Maritime Commission for disposal on 24 July 1946. Her fate is unknown.

Footnotes

References

Bibliography

External links
 

Merchant ships of the United States
Ships built in Tacoma, Washington
1937 ships
Minesweepers of the United States Navy
World War II minesweepers of the United States
Ships present during the attack on Pearl Harbor